Stadlau  is a station on  of the Vienna U-Bahn. Despite being a U-Bahn station, it is situated above the Wien Stadlau railway station, which is served by regional trains, and by line S80 of the Vienna S-Bahn.

Both stations are located in the Donaustadt District. The U-Bahn station opened in 2010.

References

Buildings and structures in Donaustadt
Railway stations opened in 2010
Vienna U-Bahn stations